The Arab is a 1924 American silent drama film starring Ramon Novarro and Alice Terry, written and directed by Rex Ingram, based on a 1911 play by Edgar Selwyn.

Plot
Jamil (Ramon Novarro) is a soldier in the Bedouin defense forces during a war between Syria and Turkey, who has deserted his regiment. In a remote village, he encounters an orphan asylum run by American missionaries Dr. Hilbert (Jerrold Robertshaw) and his daughter Mary (Alice Terry). The village is attacked by the Turks, and its ruler, eager to placate the invaders, intends to hand over the children for slaughter; he disguises his intentions under a move to Damascus for their safety.

The Bedouins arrive at the scene and reveal that Jamil is the son of the tribal leader. With his father's death revealed, Jamil becomes the new leader of the tribe, which endows him with a sense of responsibility. Risking his own life, he proceeds to save the children, defeating the Turks and the local leader in the process (and winning the girl).

Cast

Production background
The movie was filmed in North Africa just before the MGM merger, and edited under the new regime. Ingram reacted negatively to the supervision of studio bosses Mayer and Thalberg. He was backed by the New York powers of Marcus Loew and Nicholas Schenck and moved to the French Riviera, where all his subsequent films were made.

Preservation status
This is one of 12 surviving films of Terry. A print is preserved in the Russian archive Gosfilmofond and a digitally-preserved print was presented to the Library of Congress in October 2010. Another copy is located in the Cinematheque Royale de Belgique in Brussels.

Remake
The film was remade as The Barbarian (1933) again with Novarro and co-starring Myrna Loy.

Citations

External links

1924 films
1924 drama films
American silent feature films
American black-and-white films
Films directed by Rex Ingram
Metro-Goldwyn-Mayer films
1920s rediscovered films
Silent American drama films
Rediscovered American films
1920s American films